Indaka Local Municipality was an administrative area in the Uthukela District of KwaZulu-Natal in South Africa. The municipality is named after the Indaka River that runs through the municipal area.

Indaka is a predominantly rural municipality, and has no national roads running through it. Indaka's economy is currently relying on subsistence agriculture, government services and private household employment.

After municipal elections on 3 August 2016 it was merged into the larger Alfred Duma Local Municipality.

Main places
The 2001 census divided the municipality into the following main places:

Politics 
The municipal council consists of twenty members elected by mixed-member proportional representation. Ten councillors are elected by first-past-the-post voting in ten wards, while the remaining ten are chosen from party lists so that the total number of party representatives is proportional to the number of votes received.

In the election of 18 May 2011 no party obtained a majority; the Inkatha Freedom Party (IFP) won eight seats while the African National Congress (ANC) and National Freedom Party (NFP) won six seats each. The ANC and NFP formed a coalition to govern the municipality. The following table shows the results of the election.

References

External links
 Official website

Former local municipalities of South Africa